The Countess Died of Laughter (German: Frau Wirtins tolle Töchterlein, Italian: Leva lo diavolo tuo dal... convento) is a 1973 Austrian-Italian sex comedy film directed by Franz Antel. It is the final entry in Franz Antel's series Frau Wirtin and incorporates a great deal of archive footage from earlier films.

Plot
Susanne Delberg (Teri Tordai as Terry Torday) who has become Countess Süderland dies under absurd circumstances. It is revealed that Susanne had a daughter, whom she had named heiress to her inheritance; however, her identity is obscured except for the fact that she was known to have been living in a convent. The handsome executor Vincent van der Straten (Gabriele Tinti) is assigned to the task of uncovering the identity of the heiress. There are five possible candidates: Françoise (Maja Hoppe), Clarissa (Femi Benussi as Femy Benussi), Susanne (Sonja Jeannine), Piroschka (Marika Mindzenthy), and Anselma (Alena Penz). Van der Straten decides to stay at the convent to find the real heiress but things soon prove to be difficult for him since all the candidates happen to be as raunchy as late Susanne.

Cast
 Teri Tordai as Susanne Delberg 
 Gabriele Tinti as Vincent van der Straaten 
 Femi Benussi as Clarissa
 Christina Losta as Francoise 
 Marika Mindzenthy as Piroschka 
 Alena Penz as Anselma 
 Sonja Jeannine as Susanne 
 Margot Hielscher as Reverend Mother 
 Paul Löwinger as Antonius 
 Kurt Großkurth as Monk 
 Jacques Herlin as Monsieur Dulac 
 Hans Terofal as Jussuf 
 Franz Muxeneder as Farmer 
 Galliano Sbarra as Governatore 
 Joanna Jung as Anna 
 Maja Hoppe as Telltale Girl 
 Erich Padalewski as Piroschka's Lover 
 Dolores Schmidinger as Nun 
 Raoul Retzer as Osmin 
 Raimund Folkert as Florian

External links

1973 films
1970s sex comedy films
Commedia sexy all'italiana
1970s German-language films
Films directed by Franz Antel
Films scored by Stelvio Cipriani
Films set in the 1810s
Films set in Germany
Austrian sex comedy films
Austrian multilingual films
Italian multilingual films
1973 multilingual films
German historical comedy films
Italian historical comedy films
1970s historical comedy films
Constantin Film films
1973 comedy films
1970s Italian films
1970s German films